The Castle of Bemposta is a medieval castle in the civil parish of Bemposta, municipality of Mogadouro, in the Portuguese district of Bragança.

History
Between 1279 and 1325, King D. Dinis ordered the construction of walls to surround the settlement of Bemposta, which included an area of  perimeter, using the same methods and strategies employed in Miranda, with two flanked gates and corbels. It was constructed in stone and limestone. Access to water was guaranteed through a small well that already existed in the area.

In 1399, King D. João I donated Bemposta and Penas Róias to Rui Gonçalves Alcoforado.

The castle began to be part of the possessions of Vasco Pires de Sampaio, Master of Carrazeda and Master of Vila Flor, in favour of his son Fernão Vaz de Sampaio in the 15th century.

On 6 March 1758, following the writings of Father José Camelo Borges, in the Memórias Paroquiais, the town had a small wall that was referred to as a castle, where some of the residences lived. About a half a league from the Douro River, the locality was on the border country between Spain and Portugal, served by two barges that served Fermozelhe and Vilarinho de Aires. By 1797, Bemposta became the donatary captaincy of the Count of Sampaio.

Architecture
The fortifications have an oval plan that sprawl over the topography and extend into the settlement, but only the southern remnants are perceptible. The primitive structure was constructed in granite, along an irregular defensive nature. One of the gates are oriented to the east, towards the parochial church's square (today, only the local toponymy remains), while a similar gate was likely located opposite the eastern gate.

References

Notes

Sources
 
 
 
 

Bemposta
Bemposta